The 1968 St. John's Redmen baseball team represented the St. John's University in the 1968 NCAA University Division baseball season. The Redmen played their home games at Alley Pond Park. The team was coached by Jack Kaiser in his St. John's University in his 13th year at St. John's.

The Redmen won District II to advance to the College World Series, where they were defeated by the Southern Illinois Salukis.

Roster

Schedule 

! style="" | Regular Season
|- valign="top" 

|- align="center" bgcolor="#ccffcc"
| 1 || March 26 ||  || Alley Pond Park • New York, New York || 3–0 || 1–0
|- align="center" bgcolor="#ccffcc"
| 2 || March 27 ||  || Alley Pond Park • New York, New York || 5–3 || 2–0
|- align="center" bgcolor="#ffcccc"
| 3 || March 29 || at || Unknown • Garden City, New York || 4–5 || 2–1
|-

|- align="center" bgcolor="#ccffcc"
| 4 || April 2 ||  || Alley Pond Park • New York, New York || 3–0 || 3–1
|- align="center" bgcolor="#ccffcc"
| 5 || April 3 ||  || Alley Pond Park • New York, New York || 3–2 || 4–1
|- align="center" bgcolor="#ccffcc"
| 6 || April 4 ||  || Alley Pond Park • New York, New York || 2–1 || 5–1
|- align="center" bgcolor="#ccffcc"
| 7 || April 5 || Adelphi || Alley Pond Park • New York, New York || 5–0 || 6–1
|- align="center" bgcolor="#ffcccc"
| 8 || April 6 || at  || Unknown • New York, New York || 0–2 || 6–2
|- align="center" bgcolor="#ccffcc"
| 9 || April 10 ||  || Alley Pond Park • New York, New York || 1–0 || 7–2
|- align="center" bgcolor="#ffcccc"
| 10 || April 11 || at C.W. Post || Unknown • New York, New York || 1–2 || 7–3
|- align="center" bgcolor="#ccffcc"
| 11 || April 13 ||  || Alley Pont Park • New York, New York || 7–2 || 8–3
|- align="center" bgcolor="#ccffcc"
| 12 || April 16 ||  || Alley Pond Park • New York, New York || 6–0 || 9–3
|- align="center" bgcolor="#ffcccc"
| 13 || April 17 || at  || Unknown • New Haven, Connecticut || 5–6 || 9–4
|- align="center" bgcolor="#ffcccc"
| 14 || April 18 || at  || Bill Clarke Field • Princeton, New Jersey || 1–2 || 9–5
|- align="center" bgcolor="#ffcccc"
| 15 || April 20 ||  || Alley Pond Park • New York, New York || 0–1 || 9–6
|- align="center" bgcolor="#ccffcc"
| 16 || April 22 ||  || Alley Pond Park • New York, New York || 8–1 || 10–6
|- align="center" bgcolor="#ffcccc"
| 17 || April 26 ||  || Alley Pond Park • New York, New York || 1–3 || 10–7
|- align="center" bgcolor="#ccffcc"
| 18 || April 27 || at  || Unknown • New Rochelle, New York || 2–1 || 11–7
|- align="center" bgcolor="#ccffcc"
| 19 || April 28 || at  || Alley Pond Park • New York, New York || 10–0 || 12–7
|- align="center" bgcolor="#ccffcc"
| 20 || April 29 ||  || Alley Pond Park • New York, New York || 4–0 || 13–7
|-

|- align="center" bgcolor="#ccffcc"
| 21 || May 1 || at  || University Field • Hempstead, New York || 7–1 || 14–7
|- align="center" bgcolor="#ccffcc"
| 22 || May 3 ||  || Alley Pond Park • New York, New York || 7–2 || 15–7
|- align="center" bgcolor="#ccffcc"
| 23 || May 4 || at  || Unknown • New York, New York || 11–3 || 16–7
|- align="center" bgcolor="#ccffcc"
| 24 || May 6 || Central Connecticut State || Alley Pond Park • New York, New York || 11–9 || 17–7
|- align="center" bgcolor="#ffcccc"
| 25 || May 7 || at  || Owen T. Carroll Field • South Orange, New Jersey || 0–3 || 17–8
|- align="center" bgcolor="#ccffcc"
| 26 || May 8 || at  || Doubleday Field • West Point, New York || 4–0 || 18–8
|- align="center" bgcolor="#ccffcc"
| 27 || May 11 || at  || Unknown • Teaneck, New Jersey || 5–3 || 19–8
|- align="center" bgcolor="#ccffcc"
| 28 || May 14 || at  || Unknown • New York, New York || 4–0 || 20–8
|-

|-
! style="" | Postseason
|- valign="top"

|- align="center" bgcolor="#ccffcc"
| 29 || May 31 || vs Rutgers || Bill Clarke Field • Princeton, New Jersey || 12–0 || 21–8
|- align="center" bgcolor="#ccffcc"
| 30 || June 1 || vs  || Bill Clarke Field • Princeton, New Jersey || 2–0 || 22–8
|- align="center" bgcolor="#ccffcc"
| 31 || June 2 || vs NYU || Bill Clarke Field • Princeton, New Jersey || 2–0 || 23–8
|-

|- align="center" bgcolor="#ccffcc"
| 32 || June 10 || vs  || Johnny Rosenblatt Stadium • Omaha, Nebraska || 2–0 || 24–8
|- align="center" bgcolor="#ccffcc"
| 33 || June 12 || vs  || Johnny Rosenblatt Stadium • Omaha, Nebraska || 3–2 || 25–8
|- align="center" bgcolor="#ffcccc"
| 34 || June 13 || vs Southern California || Johnny Rosenblatt Stadium • Omaha, Nebraska || 6–7 || 25–9
|- align="center" bgcolor="#ffcccc"
| 35 || June 14 || vs Southern Illinois || Johnny Rosenblatt Stadium • Omaha, Nebraska || 0–15 || 25–10
|-

Awards and honors 
Ralph Addonizio
 All Tournament Team

Tom Sowinski
 All Tournament Team

References 

St. John's Red Storm baseball seasons
St. John's Redmen baseball
College World Series seasons